Haislip is a :surname.  Notable individuals with this surname include: 

 Alison Haislip (b. 1981), American television commentator and actress
 Jim Haislip (1891-1970), American baseball player
 Marcus Haislip (b. 1980), American basketball player
 Phyllis Haislip (b. 1944), American author and historian
 Wade H. Haislip (1889-1971), United States Army general